"Let's Have Another Party" is a 1954 ragtime composition which became a number one hit in the UK Singles Chart for the pianist Winifred Atwell. It is a composite of several pieces of music, and was a follow up to Atwell's successful hit "Let's Have a Party" of the previous year.

The music was written by Nat D. Ayer, Clifford Grey, James W. Tate, Ray Henderson, Mort Dixon and others. It was produced by Johnny Franz and first entered the UK chart on 26 November 1954 for an eight-week run, spending five of those weeks at number one. The medley included parts of the following tunes:

"Another Little Drink Wouldn't Do Us Any Harm"
"Broken Doll"
"Bye Bye Blackbird"
"Honeysuckle and the Bee"
"I Wonder Where My Baby is Tonight"
"Lily of Laguna"
"Nellie Dean"
"The Sheik of Araby"
"Somebody Stole My Gal"
"When the Red, Red Robin (Comes Bob, Bob, Bobbin' Along)"

Atwell was the first black person to have a number one hit in the UK.

References

1954 singles
UK Singles Chart number-one singles
Rags
1950s instrumentals
Songs with music by Ray Henderson
Songs with lyrics by Mort Dixon
Song recordings produced by Johnny Franz
Christmas number-one singles in the United Kingdom